Anthony Hugh McCrossan (born 16 April 1969) is a British sports commentator covering professional cycling.

Having started cycling in 1982 after watching the World Road Race Championships at Goodwood in England, Anthony has been commentating for over 18 years at live events, on television and major cycle shows.

Most recently, in addition to being MC and commentating at the 2012 Olympic road race, time trials, and track events, Anthony made history by becoming the first English speaking commentator at the Milano San Remo, the 95th Giro d'Italia and the il Lombardia.

He has commentated live, and voiced over thousands of hours of television, covering all the major races in the world including  The Tour De France, Giro d’Italia,  Vuelta a España,  Tour of California and every major classic including Paris–Roubaix, Tour of Flanders, Liege Bastogne Liege,  Amstel Gold, Milan–San Remo, as well as the World Road and Track Championships. Additionally he has commentated on cycling.tv, the British Cycling Premier Calendar the British Cycling Elite Circuit Series, Cyclo Cross and international Track Racing.

In 2010 he was lead commentator on the first ever live broadcast of the  British National Road Race Championships on Eurosport.

Since the launch of  Team Sky, Anthony has been a cycling expert for Sky News and Sky Sports News. In 2010 he appeared in the studio of Sky News and worked on location at the Tour De France with Orla Chennaoui. They presented live features and reports on key stages of the Tour De France including the Grand Depart and the finish in Paris.

Between 2007 and 2009 Anthony commentated on the nightly coverage of the  Tour of Britain for ITV4, as well as being the MC at the event start and the on-course announcer for 6 years.

Residing in Southampton, Anthony travels internationally working at cycling events and is the regular choice as MC of team launches including  Endura Racing,  and  Rapha Condor-Sharp. He is also heard at major cycling events including the UCI Track World Cup, The Nocturne Series, The Tour of Britain and The Tour Series as an announcer and MC. He has been the voice of the London Cycle Show, London Bike Show, has hosted the studio at Interbike in Vegas and has interviewed most of the world's top riders.  In 2008, Anthony interviewed Carlos Sastre at a Team CSC sponsor event at Alpe d'Huez after his yellow jersey clinching stage win in the Tour De France.

Anthony has also produced over 50 television broadcasts for ITV, Sky and Eurosport.

External links 
 anthonymccrossan.com
 cyclevox.com
 http://www.thewashingmachinepost.net/anthony.html
 http://www.podiumcafe.com/2008/2/4/2139/84400
 http://www.britishcycling.org.uk/road/article/roa20110122-2011-Team-Raleigh-Launch-0
 http://www.carpages.co.uk/skoda/skoda-13-01-11.asp

1969 births
Living people
Cycling announcers
British sports broadcasters